The 1st Pan Arab Games were held in Alexandria, Egypt, between 26 July and 10 August 1953. A total number of 650 athletes from 9 countries, 8 Arab countries and Indonesia (invited) participated in events in 10 sports.

Sports

Medal table

References 

 
Pan Arab Games
Pan Arab Games
Pan Arab Games
Pan Arab Games
Pan Arab Games, 1953
Multi-sport events in Egypt
July 1953 sports events in Africa
August 1953 sports events in Africa